Ene or ENE may refer to:

Ene 
 Ene (name), a given name and surname
 Ene, a type of hydrocarbon involved in the Ene reaction and the Thiol-ene reaction
 -ene, a suffix used in the names of certain organic compounds (alkenes)
 Ene, Spanish abbreviation for January
 Eñe, the Spanish name of the letter ñ
 Ene River, in Peru

 ENE 
 East-northeast, a compass point and an intercardinal directionEe Nagaraniki Emaindhi'', often abbreviated as ENE, 2018 Indian Telugu-language film 
 ENE, the IATA airport code for Ende Airport, serving Flores, Indonesia
 ENE, NYSE ticker symbol for Enron, a defunct American energy company
 Early neutral evaluation, a form of alternative dispute resolution aimed at reaching an early settlement
 End-point network element, a type of network element found in computer and telecommunications networks
 ENE, Emergent, Networked, Event-driven (ENE) process. Sometimes END